The Basotho Batho Democratic Party (BBDP) is a political party in Lesotho. It was formed and registered in 2006.

In elections held on 17 February 2007, the party won one seat in the National Assembly.

References 

Political parties in Lesotho
Political parties established in 2006
2006 establishments in Lesotho